Montfort College is a private Catholic school in Chiang Mai, Thailand.

History
The Brothers of St. Gabriel came to Chiang Mai and established Montfort Primary School in 1932 along Charoen Prathet Road on a  plot of land provided by Bishop Peross from Luang Anusarn Suntorn who gave his financial support at no interest. The land was located along the Ping River, approximately 200 meters from the Sacred Heart Church. Montfort School opened its first academic year on 16 March 1932. Fr. Reunemenier was the manager, Brother Simon the first director, Brother Ambrosio the vice-director and Brother Louis was responsible for new construction.

Montfort College opened its secondary section in 1949, started to admit girls to its secondary section from levels 10–12 in 1975 and started to admit girls to its primary section in 2009.

At present
Montfort College has two sections: primary (grades 1–6) and secondary (grades 7–12). In 2013, the secondary section had 3,238 students, while the primary had approximately 2,400 students. The school has two teaching syllabuses: normal and English.

Notable alumni
 Thaksin Shinawatra – 23rd Prime Minister of Thailand 

 Surapong Tovichakchaikul – former Deputy Prime Minister of Foreign Affairs of Thailand
 Tharin Nimmanahaeminda – former Finance Minister of Thailand
 Tawatwong na Chiang Mai – former Deputy Minister of Finance, Deputy Minister of Public Health, and Deputy Minister of Foreign Affairs of Thailand
 Chao Wonglak na Chiangmai – Prince of Chiangmai, Legitimate heir of the ruler of Chiang Mai
 Sukrit Wisetkaew – singer and actor
 Witwisit Hirunwongkul – actor and singer
 Chookiat Sakveerakul – film director
 Panupong Wongsa – footballer
 Pattadon Janngeon - actor and singer

References

External links
Montfort College website (Thai)
Montfort College website (English)
Montfort Alumni

Catholic schools in Thailand
Education in Chiang Mai
Educational institutions established in 1932
Brothers of Christian Instruction of St Gabriel schools
1932 establishments in Siam